Survivors' Guide to the United Kingdom is a supplement published by Game Designers' Workshop (GDW) in 1990 for the post-apocalyptic role-playing game Twilight: 2000.

Content
In the original Twilight: 2000 game, many of the first adventures centred around a military unit stranded in Central Europe following a fictional World War III known in the game as the "Twilight War". Survivors' Guide to the United Kingdom gives details of how to create a campaign setting for adventures set in Great Britain. 

The book covers:
Year by year effects of World War III on Great Britain, 1996–2000
Subsequent changes to geography, living conditions, the economy, and availabler armaments
A guide to various regions
Notable personalities
Various military and militia units and intelligence agencies
Random encounters

Publication history
GDW published the first edition of Twilight: 2000 in 1984. Many adventures and supplements followed including Survivors' Guide to the United Kingdom in 1990, a 48-page softcover book written by Peter Phillipps, with interior art by Kirk Wescom and Tim Bradstreet, and cover art by Radley Masinelli. 

Survivors' Guide to the United Kingdom was one of the last supplements published for the first edition of Twilight: 2000, since shortly after its release, GDW published a second edition of the game.

Reception
Allen Mixson reviewed the product in a 1991 issue of White Wolf Magazine, highly recommending it and rating it a 4 out of a possible 5 overall.

Other reviews
Terra Traveller Times, Issue 30 (July 1990, p. 5)
Games Review, Vol. 2, Issue 8 (May 1990, p.43)

References

Role-playing game supplements introduced in 1990
Science fiction role-playing game supplements
Twilight: 2000